Sotang is one of the 7 rural municipalities of Solukhumbu District of Province No. 1 of Nepal. It was established on 10 March 2017 merging former VDCs Sotang, Pawai and Gudel (only 2 wards of Gudel).

Sotang is divided into 5 wards.

Sotang is surrounded by Mahakulung rural municipality in the east, Thulung Dudhkoshi rural municipality in the north-west and Mapya DudhDudhkoshi rural municipality in the south-west. It also shares part of its southern border with Khotang District.

References

External links
 Official website of the rural municipality
 www.dzi.org

Solukhumbu District
Populated places in Solukhumbu District
Rural municipalities in Koshi Province
Rural municipalities of Nepal established in 2017
Rural municipalities in Solukhumbu District